The 1984 German Grand Prix was a Formula One motor race held at Hockenheim on 5 August 1984. It was the eleventh race of the 1984 Formula One World Championship.

The 44-lap race was won by Alain Prost, driving a McLaren-TAG, who also took pole position and set the fastest lap. Teammate Niki Lauda finished second, completing McLaren's second 1-2 finish of the season, while Derek Warwick was third in a Renault, which would turn out to be the final podium finish of his career. Nigel Mansell (Lotus-Renault), Patrick Tambay (Renault) and René Arnoux (Ferrari) rounded out the top six.

Classification

Qualifying

Race

Championship standings after the race

Drivers' Championship standings

Constructors' Championship standings

References

German Grand Prix
German Grand Prix
German Grand Prix
German Grand Prix